Goldwater is a Jewish surname.  Notable people with the surname include:

Anne-France Goldwater (born 1960), Canadian lawyer and hostess of TV's L'arbitre
Barry Goldwater (1909–1998), an American Senator
Barry Goldwater, Jr. (born 1938), politician and son of Senator Barry Goldwater
John L. Goldwater (1916–1999), American comics editor and publisher
Marilyn R. Goldwater (born 1927), American politician
Morris Goldwater (1852–1939), American politician, businessman, and uncle of Barry Goldwater
Richard Goldwater (1936–2007), American comics publisher, son of John L. Goldwater
Robert Goldwater (1907–1973), American art historian
Walter Goldwater (1907–1985), American antiquarian bookseller

Jewish surnames
Yiddish-language surnames
Surnames from ornamental names